"When the Spirit Slips Away" is the seventh single from the Dutch group Ten Sharp, released in September 1991. The music is composed by Niels Hermes and the lyrics are written by Ton Groen. There was no official video shot for this single.

The B-side "The "O" " is an instrumental piano piece, written by Niels Hermes. "He Played Real Good For Free" is a Joni Mitchell cover in the version of David Crosby, played by singer Marcel Kapteijn.

Track listings 
 7" single
 "When The Spirit Slips Away" - 4:14
 "When The Spirit Slips Away" (Instrumental) - 4:13

 CD-single
 "When The Spirit Slips Away" - 4:14
 "The "O" " - 3:18
 "He Played Real Good For Free" - 4:02
 "When The Spirit Slips Away" (Instrumental) - 4:13

Credits 
 Vocals: Marcel Kapteijn
 Instruments and programming: Niels Hermes
 Produced by Michiel Hoogenboezem and Niels Hermes
 Engineered by Michiel Hoogenboezem
 Saxophone: Tom Barlage
 Recorded and mixed at Spitsbergen Studios, Wisseloord Studios and Studio Zeezicht
 Photography: Roy Tee

References

External links 
 "When The Spirit Slips Away" on Discogs.com
 The official Ten Sharp website

1991 singles
Ten Sharp songs
1990 songs
Columbia Records singles